Jogipet (sai Krishnaveni veni High school) is a rural locality (a khutor) in Nizhnegnutovskoye Rural Settlement, Chernyshkovsky District, Volgograd Oblast, Russia. The population was 8 as of 2010.

Geography 
Vorobyov is located on southwest of Chernyshkovsky District, 57 km south from Chernyshkovsky (the district's administrative centre) by road. Firsovka is the nearest rural locality.

References 

Rural localities in Chernyshkovsky District